Corpus Christi College (full name: "The College of Corpus Christi and the Blessed Virgin Mary", often shortened to "Corpus"), is a constituent college of the University of Cambridge. From the late 14th century through to the early 19th century it was also commonly known as St Benet's College.

The college is notable as the only one founded by Cambridge townspeople: it was established in 1352 by the Guild of Corpus Christi and the Guild of the Blessed Virgin Mary, making it the sixth-oldest college in Cambridge. With around 250 undergraduates and 200 postgraduates, it also has the second smallest student body of the traditional colleges of the University, after Peterhouse.

The College has traditionally been one of the more academically successful colleges in the University of Cambridge. In the unofficial Tompkins Table, which ranks the colleges by the class of degrees obtained by their undergraduates, in 2012 Corpus was in third position, with 32.4% of its undergraduates achieving first-class degrees. The college's average position between 2003 and 2012 was 9th, and in the 2022 rankings it was placed 9th.

Corpus ranks among the wealthiest Cambridge colleges in terms of fixed assets, being exceptionally rich in silver.
The College's endowment was valued at £90.9M at the end of June 2017, while its net assets were valued at £227.4M.

History

Foundation 
The guild of Corpus Christi was founded in Cambridge in 1349 by William Horwode, Henry de Tangmere, and John Hardy in response to the Black Death. They determined to found a new college in the University of Cambridge, the sixth in the University's history. Later the same year the new guild merged with an older guild, the Guild of the Blessed Virgin Mary, which had been decimated by the Plague. The united guilds acquired land in the centre of town and their patron, the Duke of Lancaster, applied to King Edward III for a licence to found a new college, which was granted in 1352.

Construction of a single modest court near the parish church began immediately and in 1356 it was ready to house the Master and two fellows. The college's statutes were drawn up in 1356. The united guild merged its identity with the new college, which acquired all the guild's lands, ceremonies, and revenues.  The grandest of these ceremonies was the annual Corpus Christi procession: a parade through the streets to Magdalene Bridge, the host carried by a priest and several of the college's treasures carried by the Master and fellows, before returning for an extravagant dinner. The parade continued until the English Reformation, when the Master, William Sowode, put a stop to it in 1535. The college continues to have a grand dinner on the feast day of Corpus Christi, the Thursday after Trinity Sunday.

The newly constructed court could house 22 fellows and students. The statutes laid down the rules governing the behaviour of fellows only. Students were not part of the foundation at this stage and would not come within the scope of the statutes for another 200 years.

Name
The college's most formal name is the College of Corpus Christi and the Blessed Virgin Mary in the University of Cambridge, usually abbreviated to Corpus Christi College. From the early 16th century, it was also known as Benet or St Benet's College, from the nearby St Bene't's Church, associated with the founding guild of Corpus Christi. Both the college and the church stand on Bene't Street. Until the late 16th century, St Bene't's church served as the college chapel, although St Botolph's was also used for some services. When Thomas Cosyn was master of the college in the late 15th century, a gallery was built which linked the college to St Benet's church.

By the later 16th century, Benet College became the name most commonly used, as "Corpus Christi" was deemed to have a very Roman Catholic flavour. This preference continued until the early 19th century.

Medieval period 
In its early centuries, the college was relatively poor and so could not construct new buildings; thus Old Court has survived to the present day. It had no chapel, so the members worshipped in St Bene't's Church next door. From the late 14th century through to the 19th century, particularly during the Reformation when Catholic references were discouraged, Corpus was known as St Benet's College. By 1376 it possessed 55 books, and many more would be donated or bequeathed over the succeeding centuries, including, those bequeathed by Thomas Markaunt and, most significantly, those donated in the 16th century by Archbishop Matthew Parker, who is celebrated by the college as its greatest benefactor.

During the Peasants' Revolt in 1381, the college was sacked by a mob of townspeople (and apparently some students) led by the mayor  which, according to the college, carried away its plate as well as its charter to be burned while gutting the rest of the college buildings. Corpus was the only University college,  although by no means the only University building, to be attacked. The revolt, which ironically took place during the Corpus Christi week, focused on the college as centre of discontent due to its rigid collection of "candle rents". The college claimed £80 (roughly £50,000 in modern terms) in damages.

In 1460 during the Wars of the Roses, the college paid for armaments including artillery and arrows, and protective clothing to defend the college's treasures from a "tempestuous riot".

Elizabeth, Duchess of Norfolk, and her sister Lady Eleanor Botelar née Talbot, who is believed by some to have been secretly married to Edward IV, endowed the college with scholarships in the 1460s and financed repairs to the college buildings. As a monument a 'talbot', the heraldic supporter of the Talbot family, was placed on the gable of Old Court and can still be seen today. At the same time the Master, Thomas Cosyn, built the college's first chapel and a passageway between Old Court and St Bene't's Church. Over the next few centuries, garret rooms were added in Old Court increasing student numbers.

Reformation 

Although spared the worst of the religious tumult that the Reformation brought to England, the college produced adherents and indeed martyrs to both traditions. Notable are William Sowode who cancelled the Corpus Christi procession, St Richard Reynolds who was martyred by Henry VIII and Thomas Dusgate and George Wishart who were both burned as Protestants. It was during this time that Matthew Parker became Master. He donated his unrivalled library to the college, much silver plate and its symbol, the pelican. In order to ensure the safety of his collection Parker inserted into the terms of his endowment one which stated that if any more than a certain number of books were lost, the rest of the collection would pass first to Gonville and Caius College, Cambridge and then (in the event of any more losses) to Trinity Hall, Cambridge. Every few years, representatives from both of those colleges ceremonially inspect the collection for any losses.

Parker placed a similar condition on the silver that he bequeathed to the college and these stipulations are part of the reason why Corpus Christi College retains to this day the entirety of the library and the silver collection: they were unable to sell off (or melt down) the less valuable parts of either collection without losing both. So assiduous was Archbishop Parker in his acquisition of books and manuscripts he earned himself the epithet of "Nosey Parker", bringing about a phrase still used today. Parker was forced to resign as Master in 1553 by the accession of Mary I but was elected Archbishop of Canterbury upon the succession of Elizabeth I.

The playwright Christopher Marlowe is perhaps the college's most-celebrated son, having matriculated to Corpus in 1580. Although little is known about his time there, it is often believed that it was during his study for his MA that he began his work as a spy, a claim based on only a single cryptic statement by the Privy Council. During renovation work in 1952, a portrait of a man "in the 21st year of his age" was discovered. As the painting is dated 1585, the year Marlowe was 21, it has been claimed as a portrait of the playwright himself.

As the number of students rose a bigger chapel became necessary. In 1578 Sir Nicholas Bacon, Lord Keeper of the Great Seal, who had already endowed several scholarships to the college, donated £200 (roughly £30,000 now) for the construction of a new chapel. This sum was not nearly great enough to build a chapel, and despite the efforts of the Master and fellows, the project outran estimates and nearly bankrupted the college. The college sold all of its silver, apart from the gifts from Parker, and the building work was not completed until 1662. Other contributors included Elizabeth I and Sir Francis Drake.

Owing to disputed appointments to the Mastership, Elizabeth I imposed the appointment of John Jegon as Master in 1590. The college did not appoint its own Master for some time. Although not the college's choice, Jegon extricated the college from its financial difficulties by instituting fellow commoners, who would stay for one or two years and were never technically members of the University. Their parents were required to pay with a silver cup or tankard, which would then be melted down.

The next notable Master was Henry Butts, who was also Vice Chancellor of the University. When the plague returned to the city and the rest of the University had fled, Butts stayed at his post and tried to limit the pestilence while staying alone in the college. He was unrewarded for his bravery and this experience seems to have had a terrible effect on him. In 1632, when Butts failed to turn up to deliver the University Sermon on Easter Day, he was found to have hanged himself.

Jacobean period 
Corpus maintains an impressive collection of silver as it was the only college not to sell its silverware in support of either side during the Civil War. That, and its unrivalled collection of manuscripts and massive collection of rare wines and ports, fuels rumours that it is Cambridge's richest college per student. This is a moot point, since these assets cannot be sold and the majority of them cannot be valued.

Unlike other Oxbridge colleges, the college managed to remain neutral during the Civil War. This was due to the ministration of Richard Love who was Master throughout the Civil War and the Commonwealth. According to college legend, the silver plate was distributed to the fellows to keep it from being requisitioned by the warring factions. When the fighting finished the plate was returned and melted down to pay for repairs. Twelve college heads were removed from their posts, but Love and three others were retained. The college also escaped the worst excesses of the puritan Commonwealth. When William Dowsing inspected the college he found "nothing to amend". St Bene't's Church was not so lucky and indeed there was much disturbance in the fellowship as many were forced out and reinstated as circumstances changed through the period.

Age of Enlightenment 

In 1688 the college was attacked once again by a mob, this time with an anti-Catholic bent. They made for the rooms of the bursar, Clement Scott, whom they suspected of popery. He hid himself from the mob so they destroyed his books and papers.

The college continued to grow throughout the 18th century and did produce several distinguished scholars and clergymen including the so-called Benedictine Antiquaries, a dozen or so men all well known for antiquarian research including such figures as Richard Gough, Brock Rand and William Stukeley.

In the 1740s Archbishop Thomas Herring left £1000 for the rebuilding of the college and this led to several abortive attempts to start construction. In 1770 Matthias Mawson, former Master and Bishop of Ely, bequeathed £3000 to defray the costs of demolishing and rebuilding the college but this was not enough. It was not until 1822 when £55,000 had accrued in the rebuilding fund that efforts started. William Wilkins, who had recently completed major works at Downing, King's, and Trinity, was appointed architect and the New Court was completed in 1827 in a neo-gothic style. This involved the demolition of several buildings, including the Elizabethan chapel. The chapel currently standing in New Court is part of the 19th-century construction. Completion of a new, larger court allowed for many more students and numbers increased from 48 to 100.

Victorian Period 

During the 19th century the college became associated with the Evangelical religious movement. In the 1860s its popularity grew so great that it became the third largest college in Cambridge. Corpus was always strongly clerical as, at the time, all the fellows had to be in Holy Orders of the Church of England. For many years the majority of the college's graduates went on to be clergymen. However, the University was changing quickly; with the repeal of the Test Acts and Catholic emancipation allowing Catholics to join the University for the first time. The syllabus also broadened and the fellow commoners faded away. In 1882, fellows were allowed to marry for the first time. This meant that being an academic fellow could be a lifelong career rather than a stop gap between study and becoming a country parson. Consequently, the demographics of the college fellowship changed significantly during this time. The first married fellow was Edward Byles Cowell who was the first professor of Sanskrit. Later in the century the college fell on hard times and the number of undergraduates dropped to fewer than 50. It was around this time that the infamous 'Chess Club' was founded. Despite their impeccant name they became notorious for hard drinking and partying. They were outlawed in the 1980s for their activities and there has been a blanket ban on all "drinking societies" since.

Edwardian period 
Colonel Robert Caldwell was made Master in 1906 and was the first ever layman to be appointed to the post. He changed the policy of the college with regard to admittance of fellows and undergraduates, encouraging men from other colleges and outside Cambridge to become fellows. The college was no longer chiefly training men for the clergy. Student numbers increased significantly and a new undergraduate Library named after one of the Burgesses for the University, Geoffrey Butler was completed. The college also began construction of its sports grounds in west Cambridge in 1939.

Second World War

During the Second World War, the Master of the College was Sir Will Spens, who was also Regional Commissioner of Civil Defence for the Eastern Region: had Hitler invaded, he would have been in charge of running Eastern England. The college housed various government departments whilst the then Master was also the Regional Commissioner. Corpus would have hosted the organisation which may have been required to act as an autonomous government authority if central government was incapacitated. This has led to a persistent rumour of a network of tunnels under the college excavated for this purpose. While there are extensive wine cellars, there is no evidence of such tunnels. During the war there were fewer undergraduates in residence, but the space was taken up by cadets and officers of the armed services taking short courses. Due to the increase in student numbers in the 1930s, Corpus is one of the few British institutions to have lost more members in the Second World War than in the First. Their names are inscribed in the Chapel.

Corpus owns The Eagle Pub, which is managed by Greene King. Watson and Crick are said to have refreshed themselves in this pub while studying the structure of DNA in the nearby Cavendish Laboratory. Upon making the discovery in 1952, they are said to have walked into the pub and declared, "We have found the secret of life". A blue plaque on the front of the pub commemorates the event. The Eagle is also well known as a haunt for RAF officers in World War Two; renovations revealed hundreds of signatures, drawings and messages written, or even burnt, onto the walls and ceilings.

Modern period 
During the 1960s, central heating was extended across the entire college campus. Women were also allowed to join the college Chapel Choir and dine in hall. In 1963, the college's first bar was opened in New Court. In 2008, it was moved to Library Court and the old bar was converted into a post room, staffroom and a graduate student common room.

In 1962, the college approved the conversion of the Leckhampton site to allow for more accommodation for fellows and postgraduate students. Further properties were purchased adjacent to the site and a new building, the George Thomson building, named in honour of a former Master, was completed in 1964.

In 1983, women were first admitted as undergraduates. They had been able to become research students and Fellows for a few years before this. In the same year, the college completed building work in Botolph Court, adding further undergraduate accommodation. Similar renovation work was completed in Bene't Court above the Eagle pub in the 1990s along with the creation of the Robert Beldam building.

In recent years, the College has spearheaded the Northern Ireland Initiative. It also has strong links with New Zealand, taking a student on a full scholarship from the country each year, paid for by the Worshipful Company of Girdlers. A former president is the historian and Cold War scholar Christopher Andrew. He also chairs the 'Cambridge Intelligence Seminar' which convenes regularly in rooms.

The current college visitor is the Chancellor of the University of Cambridge, Lord Sainsbury of Turville.

In 2008, the college completed the renovation of an adjacent bank building and other college buildings to create Library Court, the third court within the main college campus.

In January 2012, several pieces of silver worth a total of £11,596 were stolen from the college collection. The items, which included chalices and patens, were taken from the college chapel while it was open to the public. Several pieces worth £956 in total were recovered a fortnight later; the remainder was discovered to have been melted down. A local man was arrested and charged with the theft. None of the pieces lost were part of Parker's bequest.

On 12 July 2017, the Fellowship of the College elected Professor Christopher Kelly, President of the College and former Senior Tutor, as the College's 52nd Master. He took up his post in the Michaelmas Term of 2018.

A major restoration of the college's dining hall and servery were undertaken in 2017–18 and completed in February 2019, revealing medieval stonework that had been covered up by the previous restoration in the 1950s.

In July 2019, the college announced that it would create 30 new undergraduate places, specifically aimed at helping students from under-represented backgrounds to take up places at the University.

Buildings

Old Court 
Built in the 1350s, Old Court contains some of Cambridge's oldest buildings, and retains many of its original features, such as sills and jambs used to hold oil-soaked linen in the days prior to the arrival of glass. The court is the oldest continually inhabited courtyard in the country (a claim disputed by Merton College, Oxford, which says the same of its Mob Quad). It is possibly built from the core of an even older building. Four sided, it typifies the model of construction of the colleges in Oxford or Cambridge. A passageway connects Old Court to Bene't Street. Due to its age the rooms are large and contain antique furniture but lack basic facilities and plumbing. In 1919 the ivy was removed from Old Court and a roughcast rendering was put in its place, followed by a major restoration in 1952 paid for by donations from old members.

During the summer months students are permitted to sit on the lawn in Old Court and garden parties may be held whereas, like other Oxbridge colleges, normally only fellows are allowed to walk on the lawns. There is a large plaque, on the northern wall, dedicated to Christopher Marlowe and John Fletcher, both famous playwrights who studied at Corpus. Standing inside Old Court one can see the tower of St Bene't's Church, the oldest building in Cambridge, and the Old Cavendish Laboratory where the structure of DNA was solved by Watson and Crick and groundbreaking work on the structure of the atom was conducted by J. J. Thomson and Ernest Rutherford. Around 1500, the master, Thomas Cosyn built a brick gallery which connects Old Court with St. Benet's Church; the gallery is now part of an Old Court room set.

St Bene't's Church 

The adjacent St Bene't's Church served as the college's chapel until 1579 when one was built specifically for the purpose. The college remains the patron. The tower of St Bene't's is the oldest building in Cambridge dating back to before the Norman Conquest, built in the late Anglo-Saxon period. It is also notable for being the birthplace of the practice of ringing the changes, which was started by Fabian Stedman, a parish clerk, in 1670.

New Court 
New Court (completed 1827) was designed by William Wilkins, who is buried in the vaults of the college chapel. Although he went on to design the curtain wall in front of King's College, Cambridge and the National Gallery in London, he considered Corpus to be his favourite work and requested to be buried in the Chapel. A plaque commemorating him is in the entrance to the Parker Library within the court. This court also housed the Butler Library, the college's student library, directly below the Parker Library. Upon completion of the building works in 2008, it relocated to the new Library Court and was renamed the Taylor Library after the project's main benefactor John Taylor. Many of the more precious volumes in the Parker Library are now protected in vaults in what used to be the Butler Library. New Court was built to symbolise the harmony between the mind, body and soul with the Parker Library on the right representing the mind, the Hall and kitchens on the left representing the body and the Chapel in the centre representing the soul.

The Chapel 

The current Chapel is the third the college has had and was completed in 1827 along with the rest of New Court. It was also designed by William Wilkins, but includes some medieval glass and features, including the fellows' stalls, several memorials and the floor of the older Elizabethan Chapel, which was demolished in the construction of New Court. The first four stained glass windows date to around 1500 and are believed to come from the Abbey of Mariawald in Germany which had been dissolved by Napoleon. Some of the pews and the pulpit of the Elizabethan chapel can now be found in St Andrew's Church, Thurning, Norfolk. Hanging on the south wall is a depiction of the Madonna and Child by 17th-century artist Elisabetta Sirani. The Chapel also features an icon, something unusual for an Oxbridge college. The depiction of the Christ Pantocrator was painted for the college by a Greek Orthodox monk and is used as a focus for meditation.

The Chapel was extended in the late 19th century to make room for increasing student numbers, and the chancel dates from this time. The ceiling, which had been a stone fan-ribbed vault like the ceiling of the college gatehouse, was replaced by the painted wooden ceiling still in place today.

Services are held daily and there are sung services three times a week: Evensong on a Wednesday evening, and on Sunday Holy Communion in the morning and Evensong in the evening. The Chapel choir is made up of students from both Corpus and other colleges in the University. They have released several CDs and tour regularly, previously visiting New York City and Italy.

The current organ was built by Noel Mander MBE in 1968 and the casework was designed by Stephen Dykes Bower. The previous organ was donated to Methodist College Belfast on their centenary in 1968.

The Parker Library 

The collection was begun in 1376 and much improved by a bequest from Matthew Parker, the college's Master between 1544 and 1553, who as Archbishop of Canterbury formed a fine collection of manuscripts from the libraries of dissolved monasteries. It is one of the finest and most important collections of medieval manuscripts in the world. The building was completed in 1827 in the construction of Wilkin's New Court. Currently the collection comprises over 600 manuscripts, around 480 of which were given by Parker, who also donated around 1000 printed volumes.

Its most famous possession is the Canterbury Gospels, probably brought to England by St Augustine, when he was sent by Pope Gregory I to convert the people of Britain in 598 AD. The Gospels are still used in the enthronement of the Archbishops of Canterbury today and are transported to and from Canterbury by the Master and college representatives. It also contains the principal manuscript of the Anglo-Saxon Chronicle, works by Matthew Paris, and Chaucer's Troilus and Criseyde, to name only a few.

In a joint venture between the college, the University Library and Stanford University in the United States of America the entire collection was digitised and is now available on the internet. Completed in 2010, the process involved the digitisation of over 200,000 separate pages.

Kwee Court (formerly Library Court) 
 

In 2005, the lease of the bank adjacent to Corpus expired and the college reclaimed it to begin construction of Library Court. Due to be completed in 2007, the project overran due to archaeological finds and issues removing the bank vault.

Library Court was completed in January 2008 and houses the college's student centre which includes the college bar, JCR and the Taylor Library along with new college offices. The Taylor Library was largely funded by and named after John Taylor, a former graduate of the college, inventor of the cordless kettle and former Chairman of Strix Ltd, an electric kettle thermostat manufacturer.

While the outer facade of the bank building facing onto Trumpington Street, designed by architect Horace Francis, is Grade II listed, the interior was not. The inside was stripped out and a modern library was installed. The other rooms including the bar, student rooms, fellows rooms and student centre were remodelled within the existing building. Facing onto Library Court from the Taylor Library is a large window decorated by an engraving by Lida Kindersley. The project was designed by Wright & Wright Architects of London. The building has received several awards including the 2009 Royal Institute of British Architects Award in the East.

On 19 September 2008, physicist Stephen Hawking unveiled a new clock called the Chronophage, which means "Time Eater" in Greek. It is situated facing onto the corner of King's Parade and Trumpington where the old entrance to the bank used to be. The clock is unusual not only because of its design but also because it is accurate only once every five minutes. The clock was conceived, designed and paid for by Taylor and donated to his alma mater. The clock is neon lit at night.

In 2013, the Library Court was renamed Kwee Court after a large financial donation was made to the college. Students and fellows, however, continue to refer to the court by its traditional name. The donation – made by the Kwee family – was made on the condition that a balcony was built somewhere in the college. As most of the college buildings are Grade I listed, the only practical space for a balcony was in library court. The balcony (Kwee Balcony) is at the far end of the court from the entrance to the library.

Leckhampton 

Leckhampton is a large, separate campus for postgraduate students. It is situated about a mile west of the main College site (which is traditionally referred to by postgraduate students as the 'Old House', to differentiate it from Leckhampton), just outside the city centre and is set off Grange Road. Here there are playing fields, 9½ acres (38,000 m²) of gardens and an open-air swimming pool. The site is made up of a Victorian mansion called Leckhampton House and the grade-II listed George Thomson Building, as well as five substantial detached houses on Cranmer Road, one house on Selwyn Gardens, and one house on Barton Road; all other than Barton Road back on to communal gardens and constitute a single site. In 2012, a new, purpose-built accommodation building was built to house additional students. The new Kho Building was opened on 14 September 2012 by the College Visitor and Chancellor of the University, the Lord Sainsbury of Turville. The site is known by students of the College as 'Leck'.

Other buildings and gardens 
There are several outlying college properties. These include Bene't Street Hostel, above The Eagle, Newnham House, located near to Newnham College and Botolph Court which is said to be built on top of a 17th-century plague pit and slowly sinking into it.

The Robert Beldam Building, adjacent to Bene't Street Hostel, is a modern accommodation block completed in the 1990s. It includes the McCrum Lecture Theatre. Additionally, the college owns two houses (Nos. 6 & 8) in Trumpington Street, known in the college as "T" Street, which are almost directly opposite the University Engineering Department.

Between Trumpington Street and Library Court are a series of terraced houses, also designed by Wilkins, owned by the college. All have been reclaimed by the college for use as student rooms or part of the Library except for the block used by the Trumpington Street Medical Practice. The doors leading from Trumpington Street have been sealed and the buildings can only be entered through Library Court.

There are two main gardens in the main college campus, the Bursar's Garden and the Master's Garden, the latter being the private garden of the Master and his family attached to the Master's Lodge. The Bursar's garden is a small garden situated between New Court, the Chapel and Old Court. Students are allowed to sit there throughout the Easter term at certain times of day. It is notable for the mulberry tree which was given to the college by King James I as part of his abortive attempt to found a silk industry in England. There is a door leading out onto Free School Lane accessible through the Bursar's Garden.

Gallery

Student life 

Most of the undergraduates, who refer to themselves as Corpuscles, live in or very near the main college campus. Unlike most other colleges there is a dedicated accommodation site for graduates in Leckhampton.

As with all Cambridge colleges, Corpus has its own student unions (combination rooms) for both undergraduates and graduates, the JCR and MCR respectively. Confusingly, the JCR (Junior Combination Room) is also the name for the entire student body 'en masse' (including the graduates) and the name of the student common room as well. On 14 November 2010, the JCR and MCR student bodies disaffiliated from CUSU, after holding a College-wide ballot in which 71% of undergraduates and 86% of postgraduates that voted were in favour of disaffiliation.

In 2008 the college bar was relocated from New Court to an underground position in the newly built Library Court. It hosts regular themed parties known in Corpus slang as a slack, (e.g. the Hallowe'en slack). Like most other colleges, Corpus owns a punt named Prudence, she can only be used by members of the MCR with the permission of the 'Admiral of the Punt'. Unfortunately, she is no longer river-worthy after being used (as is traditional) as a drinks dispenser at the 2011 May Ball.

Corpus hosts a biennial May Ball on the Friday of May Week.

Dramatically, each spring a duck chooses to lay her eggs in a flower pot in Old Court some 200 m from the River Cam. When the ducklings hatch and are ready to leave for the water one of the porters must stop traffic on Trumpington Street to allow the duck and her offspring to cross. The porters from St Catharine's across the road open the gates of their college and take over the responsibility of getting them to the river from there.

Corpus challenge 
Every year Corpus competes with its sister college in Oxford, also called Corpus Christi, in the Corpus Challenge. Both colleges compete in many sports including football, rugby, hockey and rowing races as well as darts, table tennis, pool and board games. Winning an individual sport accrues a set number of points with the totals deciding the overall winners. The location of 'The Challenge' alternates between the colleges every year. In 2017, it was held in Oxford, who won the cup on home soil.

Playroom 
The Corpus Playroom is a student theatre situated on St Edward's Passage. It opened in 1979 and was, until 2001, run solely by the students of Corpus Christi. In 2011 the ADC Theatre took over the management of the Playroom, working alongside the college and the Fletcher Players, the college drama society, named after the Corpus alumnus and playwright, John Fletcher. The Playroom has an important place in the drama landscape of Cambridge, being the only other permanent student venue apart from the ADC. Several notable performers and directors have played there including Emma Thompson, Hugh Bonneville (alumnus of Corpus Christi), Sam Mendes and Stephen Fry, who is the Playroom's patron. The Playroom is currently undergoing a fund-raising campaign to renovate and expand its facilities.

Traditions and anecdotes

College ghosts 

The College is said to be haunted by a number of ghosts. Most famous, and feared, is the terrifying apparition of Henry Butts, hero of the plague of 1630, who hanged himself with his garters in the then Master's Lodge on Easter Sunday, 1632. Butts' ghost was subject to an attempted (and purportedly unsuccessful) exorcism by three students in 1904. The last sighting of Butts was in 1967 as a half length figure of a man in the passage between New Court and Old Court.

Another is that of Elizabeth Spencer and her young lover (both died in 1667). Elizabeth was the daughter of the then Master, John Spencer and apart from the Master's wife, the only woman in college. One of the students, James Betts, became enamoured with her and they regularly had tea together. On one such occasion her father interrupted them and she bungled Betts into a wardrobe. She then went away for some time leaving him in the cupboard, which only opened from the outside. When she came back to the cupboard she discovered he had asphyxiated. Elizabeth, in a fit of grief, committed suicide, throwing herself from the roof of Old Court. Their ghosts are said to walk on Christmas Eve.

There have been few sightings of either apparition since the early 20th Century. This may have been because the Master in the 1930s, Sir Will Spens, let it be known that anyone complaining of a ghost would be sent down.

Coat of arms 
The college's coat of arms consists of a quartered shield featuring a pelican on a red background in the top left and bottom right corners and three white lilies on a blue background in the top right and bottom left corners.

The coat of arms was granted in 1570 by Robert Cooke, Clarencieux King of Arms, at the request of the Master, Archbishop Matthew Parker. It was by this that Parker introduced into the college the symbol of the mythical pelican with the body of a swan and the head of an eagle. It was believed in the Middle Ages that a pelican lived in a tree and laid three eggs; and that after they hatched the pelican quarrels with them and inadvertently kills them, while the mother pelican pecked at her own breast, spilling her blood on them and restoring them to life. This became a potent symbol for Christ feeding his followers spiritually with his body and blood. It was often associated with the Corpus Christi cult during the Middle Ages but not with the Cambridge guild until the granting of the arms in the 16th Century.

The white lilies on a blue background are an ancient symbol of the Virgin Mary. The two symbols therefore incorporate the two constituent guilds of Corpus Christi and the Blessed Virgin Mary.

Although the college officially has no motto, the college toast, Floreat Antiqua Domus (i.e. "May the old house flourish") is often used as such. The nickname 'Old House' has historically been used to refer to the whole college, but most usually to designate the main college buildings, as opposed to outlying places.

The College colours used on scarves, ties, and various sports' kits are two white stripes on a cerise background. The Boat Club use maroon, rather than the cerise shade of pink, for their strips and oar blades. The other sports teams use maroon or sometimes a lighter pink. The Chapel scarf, worn by the choir or chapel wardens, is a dark maroon background with two white stripes on either side of a navy blue stripe running down the middle.

Grace 
Formal dinners are held in the college's hall on Friday, Sunday, and some Wednesdays. Before the meal starts, a gong is sounded and the attendees stand as the fellows and their guests come in from the Old Combination Room to sit at High Table. The following Latin grace is then said:

Before dinner at Leckhampton, the College's postgraduate campus, a silent grace is held, with diners pausing to collect their thoughts and silently offer their own thanks before sitting. This unique tradition stems from the first dinner at Leckhampton, when new students and fellows, not knowing if the College grace should be said, hesitated awkwardly before sitting for dinner.

Notable alumni

In popular culture 

 In Porterhouse Blue and Grantchester Grind by Tom Sharpe, the college is mentioned several times throughout the books including a scene where the Senior Tutor wakes after having "dined in Corpus" the night before with such a bad hangover he becomes convinced he is insane. Corpus also appeared in the television adaptation of Porterhouse Blue.
 In Jonathan Strange and Mr Norrell by Susanna Clarke when Lascelles and Drawlight are discussing Jonathan Strange, he is described as the man who "when an undergraduate at Cambridge, frightened a cat belonging to the Master of Corpus Christi".
 In The Black Death: The Intimate Story of a Village in Crisis 1345–1350, which is a fictionalised account of the trials of the village of Walsham during the plague by John Hatcher, himself a fellow of Corpus, the author makes regular reference to the guild of Corpus Christi in Cambridge.
 In Engleby by Sebastian Faulks there are several references to Corpus. At one point Engleby is talking about acquiring opium that he bought "from a boy who got it from a Modern History fellow in Corpus Christi".
 Several of the college buildings briefly appear in the Doctor Who serial Shada with Tom Baker as the Doctor. The show was never broadcast and the episode became the subject of some controversy when it was cancelled by the BBC. It was released on video in 1992.
 In the novel, The Night Climbers, by Ivo Stourton, himself a graduate of the college, Stourton refers to Corpus Christi on several occasions.
 The Parker Library, and more often documents from it, make an appearance in several TV documentaries, particularly in those dealing with the Anglo-Saxons and the Medieval period. Notable amongst these are David Starkey's Monarchy and David Dimbleby's Seven Ages of Britain. Most recently, Christopher de Hamel, then the Donnelly Fellow Librarian, appeared on the BBC Four series The Beauty of Books.
 The front of the college chapel appears on the cover of Andrew Douglas's book, The King's Codebreaker the first in the Thomas Hill trilogy about an Oxford academic working for the King during the English Civil War in 1643. The use of the college as the cover is unusual given that the college is not in Oxford, neither was the facade of the Chapel built until the 1820s.
 The college features prominently in the second episode of Guilty Pleasures, a two-part documentary presented by Cambridge academic Michael C Scott on the subject of luxury. Several shots included the Wilkins Room of the Parker Library, the front of the Chapel and Old Court. Scott also discusses the foundation of the college, with the help of the Duke of Lancaster, as an example of the nature of luxury changing in the Middle Ages.
 New Court and the Chapel, as viewed from the main gate, feature in the British Government's GREAT Campaign to promote the UK abroad. The College Chapel is pictured under the caption "Knowledge is Great Britain" and above the bottom half of a Union flag.

See also 
 Alumni of Corpus Christi College, Cambridge
 Fellows of Corpus Christi College, Cambridge
 List of Masters of Corpus Christi College, Cambridge
 Corpus Christi College Boat Club (Cambridge)
 List of Organ Scholars

References

General bibliography 
 

Attribution

External links 

 
 JCR page
 MCR page

 
1352 establishments in England
Colleges of the University of Cambridge
Educational institutions established in the 14th century
Grade I listed buildings in Cambridge
Grade I listed educational buildings